M311 or M-311 may refer to:

 M-311 (Michigan highway)
 Alenia Aermacchi M-311, a turbofan-powered military trainer 
 EML Wambola (M311), a Lindau-class minehunter of the Estonian Navy
 The CQ M-311, a variant of the Norinco CQ rifle
 The M-311 compass invented by Tuomas Vohlonen